Brentwood is a city in Contra Costa County, California, United States. It is located in the East Bay region of the San Francisco Bay Area. The population is 66,854 as of 2022, an increase of 287% from 23,302 at the 2000 census.

Brentwood began as a community in the late 19th century. The community is still known throughout the Bay Area for its agricultural products - primarily its cherries, corn and peaches. Due to urban sprawl many of the old farms and orchards have been replaced by suburban developments since 1990. Brentwood is increasingly residential, with the rate of population growth in the triple digits during the 1990s and 69% from 2000 through 2010. An official estimate showed the population increased nearly 21% during the period 2010 to 2016.

History 

Brentwood was originally laid out on land donated from property owned by John Marsh, an East Contra Costa County pioneer who acquired Rancho Los Méganos, the land grant that Brentwood is built upon, in 1837 from Jose Noriega. Marsh was one of the wealthiest men in California and was instrumental in its becoming independent from Mexico and part of the United States.  His letters extolling the potential for agriculture in California were published in newspapers throughout the East.  They resulted in the first wagon trains to California.  Marsh encouraged this, and allowed new arrivals to stay on his ranch until they could get settled.  Rancho Los Méganos became the terminus of the California Trail.  Brentwood was named after Marsh's ancestral home, the town of Brentwood in the County of Essex, England.

Brentwood's first post office was established in 1878. The city incorporated in 1948.

Balfour, Guthrie & Co., a British investment company, purchased the John Marsh ranch in 1910. The company invested heavily in other California agricultural properties as well. In 1910, it built the Brentwood Hotel at Oak Street and Brentwood Boulevard, across from the railroad station. This replaced an earlier hotel on the same site that had burned down in 1903. The hotel was razed in 1967, and replaced by a service station.

 The Brentwood water tower perhaps symbolizes the city's transition from a rural farm community to a modern bedroom community. This landmark on Walnut Boulevard, across the street from the Brentwood Park and Ride lot, is the tallest structure in the city. It is no longer used for its original purpose, but now serves as a cell phone tower. City water is stored in large tanks atop hills outside the city.

The city is bordered on three sides by the Contra Costa County Agricultural Core which consists of 11,000 acres of preserved and still actively productive farm land.

The Streets of Brentwood, an outdoor lifestyle retail center, opened in Brentwood in 2008.

The city broke ground for a new civic center in November, 2009. The Mission-style architectural inspiration for City Hall, the main building, was the 1910 Brentwood Hotel. The $60 million project, completed in May 2012, includes the 58,000-square-foot City Hall and state-of-the-art City Council Chambers, a 32,000-square-foot community center, 280-space parking garage and redevelopment of the -acre City Park. The community center also includes arts and crafts rooms as well as studios for dance classes and community exercise programs. The center received a Leadership in Energy and Environmental Design silver certification for amenities such as green roofs, biosales, permeable paving and infiltration planters. City departments began moving into the new facility in October 2011, and the former city hall was demolished during November 2011.

Indigenous History 
Brentwood was home to the Julpuns who settled mainly in the upper corner of the East Bay. The Julpun were Native Americans who were a part of the Bay Miwok tribes who spoke the same language in an area, which is a branch of the Eastern Miwok Language. The Bay Miwok tribes would generally include 50-200 people in each village, where they would build their villages along the creeks since they were filled with fish. The Julpun believed that everything in the world had a life or spirit and were very in tune with the nature around them. They set things as sacred where they would pray at as part of their religious beliefs, they ended up coining Mt. Diablo, or as they call it Supremenenu, as the birthplace of the world. Due to this, they would hold the top points of Mt. Diablo to be used for sacred gatherings or religious purposes.

Back then the Julpun were never reached out to by ethnographers or linguists when the Julpun still retained their language, the Bay Miwok. They weren't mainly concentrated but spread out from the San Joaquin River to the bottom part of Marsh Creek which is now the southern part of Brentwood. Between 1806-1808 few of the Julpun migrated over to Mission San Jose with about 100 or so went by 1813. Later on Milliken listed down that about 141 Julpun members were baptized by 1819 from Mission San Jose. As time went on, Mission San Jose converted from religious beliefs and values to secular institutions where the Julpun members ended up leaving in 1836 back to their original territory. John Marsh ended up acquiring Rancho Los Meganos from Jose Noriega in 1837 which would cover modern Brentwood and back then cover the Julpuns territory. However, due to Mission San Jose revoking the spiritual possession it once had, the Julpuns may have went back to their territory and ended up working under John Marsh on the land where their home once was.

In present time the Julpun tribe have more or less settled around the Bay Area. Some are living in specific groups, while others are living in society where they are preserving their native culture even though they may be away from their tribes. They (the Julpun) are working with the National Park Service, where they united under one federally recognized tribe called the Federated Indians of Graton Rancheria.

Geography 

As is common with many East Bay towns in Contra Costa County, Mount Diablo is clearly seen from Brentwood.  Brentwood is located on the alluvial plain of the Sacramento-San Joaquin Delta. In the picture shown at right, Brentwood lies center right and the city of Antioch, California lies center left. North Peak appears in the foreground between the two cities and largely hides the city of Oakley.

The East Bay Regional Park District is a special San Francisco Bay Area district operating in the East Bay counties of Alameda County and Contra Costa County. East Bay Regional Park District trails and parks are found in Brentwood.

The landscape on the west is marked by rolling hills, non-native grasses, oak trees, fruit orchards, and vineyards, with a number of public golf courses.

Climate 
Brentwood borders on the Mediterranean (Csa) and Semi-arid climates (Bsh). Like most of East Contra Costa County, Brentwood lies in the rain shadow of Mt. Diablo and receives less rainfall than many of its neighbors. The wet season is generally October through April, though there may be a day or two of light rainfall in June or September.  Summer heat is often moderated by the Delta breeze, especially in the late afternoon, causing temperatures to cool rapidly.

Government
The City of Brentwood operates under the City Manager form of government. Under policy direction of the City Council, the City Manager serves as the Chief Administrative Officer of the city; assumes full responsibility for planning, administering, directing, overseeing, and evaluating the activities and operations of all City departments. The following city departments report directly to the manager:
Community Development
Administrative Services
Parks and Recreation
Police
Public Works / Engineering and Operations

Politics

According to the California Secretary of State, as of February 10, 2019, Brentwood has 34,774 registered voters. Of those, 13,974 (40.2%) are registered Democrats, 9,710 (27.9%) are registered Republicans, and 9,376 (27%) have declined to state a political party.

Brentwood Police Department (BPD)
Brentwood established its own city police department in 1948, when it was primarily a small farming community.

Tom Hansen, a 23-year veteran of the BPD, was appointed acting police chief in April, 2017, after then-chief Mark Evenson went on medical leave. Evenson officially retired in August, still citing unnamed health problems as the reason for his departure. City Manager Gus Vina announced that Hansen would become the permanent chief, effective December 16, 2017. Hansen has earned a bachelor's degree in criminal justice from Sacramento State and a master's degree in emergency services administration from California State University, Long Beach. His other specialized training includes participating in the West Point Leadership Program, the FBI National Academy and the Senior Management Institute of Police. Before joining BPD, Hansen was a police officer in Walnut Creek and Kensington, California.

Fire Protection
Fire protection is provided by the East Contra Costa Fire Protection District (ECCFPD), which reports to the Contra Costa County Board of Supervisors. Resources are shared with the communities of Oakley, Bethel Island, Knightsen, Byron and Discovery Bay. It also covers certain unincorporated areas of the county. The fire district is headquartered in the Brentwood City Hall building.

The fire district had to close two fire stations in 2015 because of funding issues. This has left only three stations to cover an area of 249 square miles. One station remains open in Brentwood, Oakley, and Discovery Bay.

Delta Patrol Station
The Delta Patrol Station, a unit of the Contra Costa County Sheriff's office has signed an agreement with the City of Brentwood to move its existing office from Oakley to a larger space in Brentwood. The Delta Patrol Station has occupied a 1920s era building for over four decades, and has been looking for a larger facility in East County to serve the growing population for faster response in unincorporated Contra Costa County areas (e.g., Byron, Discovery Bay and Knightsen). Response time for Bethel Island is expected to remain the same.

Education

Public schools
Brentwood's public education system has about 7 elementary, 3 middle, and 4 high schools, Independence High School, Liberty High School, La Paloma High School, and Heritage High School.

The city is served by the Brentwood Union School District, Knightsen School District and the Liberty Union High School District. The Brentwood Union School District runs on a modified traditional school calendar. The Brentwood Union School District has many schools designated as a California Distinguished School. Approximately five percent of California schools are awarded this honor.

Heritage High School includes a full range of Advanced Placement courses and the highest Academic Performance Index (California public schools)(API) score in the area, stellar performing arts programs, and championship athletic teams. Heritage is also a solar school. The 2.38 kW photovoltaic project installed at Heritage High School is designed to demonstrate the benefits and opportunities created by renewable energy technology and provide a powerful learning tool for both students and the community.

Community college
Los Medanos College began operating a satellite facility (Brentwood Center) at Sand Creek Road and Brentwood Boulevard in the city. The existing Center has outgrown its limited space in a former grocery store, where it has no room for expansion. The Brentwood Center has acquired property in the southwest part of the city, where it plans to build a new  campus. Construction is expected to begin in 2018 and classes are expected to begin in the spring of 2020.

Public library
The temporary Brentwood branch of the Contra Costa County Library, located at 104 Oak Street, across from the Civic Center and City Park, was razed early in 2017, along with two other city-owned buildings at 118 and 120 Oak Street to be replaced by the long-awaited new Brentwood branch library. The Brentwood City Council approved the design for the new  facility in September, 2016. The facility was completed in 2018, and serves a population of more than 50,000. The library collection includes materials in both Spanish and English. It also offers a wide variety of media, including DVDs, CDs, and audiobooks, as well as a large print collection. The library offers a number of programs for all ages, including storytimes for babies and toddlers.

Demographics

2010
The 2010 United States Census reported that Brentwood had a population of 51,481. The racial makeup of Brentwood was 34,969 (67.9%) White, 3,389 (6.6%) African American, 333 (0.6%) Native American, 4,051 (7.9%) Asian, 202 (0.4%) Pacific Islander, 4,964 (9.6%) from other races, and 3,573 (6.9%) from two or more races. Hispanic or Latino of any race were 13,779 persons (26.8%).

The Census reported that 51,335 people (99.7% of the population) lived in households, 141 (0.3%) lived in non-institutionalized group quarters, and 5 (0%) were institutionalized.

There were 16,494 households, out of which 8,047 (48.8%) had children under the age of 18 living in them, 10,560 (64.0%) were opposite-sex married couples living together, 1,823 (11.1%) had a female householder with no husband present, 825 (5.0%) had a male householder with no wife present.  There were 794 (4.8%) unmarried opposite-sex partnerships, and 141 (0.9%) same-sex married couples or partnerships. 2,616 households (15.9%) were made up of individuals, and 1,355 (8.2%) had someone living alone who was 65 years of age or older. The average household size was 3.11.  There were 13,208 families (80.1% of all households); the average family size was 3.47. The median income for a household in the town was $97,202.

The population was spread out, with 16,058 people (31.2%) under the age of 18, 3,854 people (7.5%) aged 18 to 24, 13,991 people (27.2%) aged 25 to 44, 11,703 people (22.7%) aged 45 to 64, and 5,875 people (11.4%) who were 65 years of age or older.  The median age was 35.6 years. For every 100 females, there were 94.2 males.  For every 100 females age 18 and over, there were 90.4 males.

The homeowner vacancy rate was 2.7%; the rental vacancy rate was 6.0%.  38,410 people (74.6% of the population) lived in owner-occupied housing units and 12,925 people (25.1%) lived in rental housing units.

2000
As of the 2000 census, there were 23,265 residents. The population density was 2,001.2/sqmi (774/km2). There were 7,788 housing units at an average density of 668.8/sqmi (259/km2). The racial makeup of the town was 75.38% White, 9.40% African American, 0.75% Native American, 6.99% Asian, 0.10% Pacific Islander, 5.96% from other races, and 1.43% from two or more races. Hispanic or Latino of any race were 10.34% of the population.
There were 23,700 households, out of which 45.8% had children under the age of 18 living with them, 69.2% were married couples living together, 7.0% had a female householder with no husband present, and 25.4% were non-families. 19.9% of all households were made up of individuals, and 13.3% had someone living alone who was 65 years of age or older. The average household size was 2.58 and the average family size was 2.93.
In the town the population was spread out, with 22.9% under the age of 18, 3.2% from 18 to 24, 19.4% from 25 to 44, 33.4% from 45 to 64, and 21.0% who were 65 years of age or older. The median age was 48 years. For every 100 females, there were 96.8 males. For every 100 females age 18 and over, there were 91.7 males.
The median income for a household in the town was $87,068, and the median income for a family was $91,796. Males had a median income of $58,059 versus $39,585 for females. The per capita income for the town was $33,621. About 5.4% of families and 9.3% of the population were below the poverty line, including 6.3% of those under age 18 and 3.5% of those age 65 or over.

Economy
Agriculture remains important to the local economy, but has declined in relative importance as the city has become more suburban. Local wineries including Bloomfield, Tamayo, and Hannah Nicole have gained in sales and prestige after winning numerous medals in recent years at the San Francisco Chronicle Wine Competition and the California State Fair. There is no heavy industry and only a small light industrial area in the northeastern part of the city. Brentwood underwent a strong economic boom from 2000 through 2008. Population expanded from 23,302 in 2000 to about 48,000 in 2006, a higher growth rate than other communities in the Bay Area. Some of the new neighborhoods were centered around two new golf courses, the Shadow Lakes Golf Club and the Deer Valley Golf Club,  that were constructed to take advantage of the views of Mt. Diablo. The boom stalled in 2009, paralleling the economic crisis that affected all of California, but successful new home subdivisions, including a gated community (Carmel Estates), appeared again in 2010. In 2013, Brentwood's economy displayed renewed economic vigor with substantial new activity in residential and commercial/retail construction. Sales offices of new home subdivisions commonly advertise new houses beginning in the $500Ks with the largest homes with many upgrades nearing $1M. The overall improvement in the Bay Area economy and anticipation for the 2015 completion of eBart and highway improvements in East Contra Costa County are playing a part in the revival of strong economic growth in Brentwood. One of the most exciting development opportunities in Brentwood is linked to the two Federal research facilities – Lawrence Livermore National Laboratory and Sandia National Laboratories – that are located 25 minutes south of Brentwood. Brentwood has established close relations with the national labs and is a member of i-GATE, which is a regional partnership designed to promote tech-oriented business growth connected with the labs.

Top employers
According to the city's 2018 Comprehensive Annual Financial Report, the top employers in the city are:

Transportation

Highway
Public transportation is very limited, so the principal roads leading into the city are very congested with commuter traffic. No freeways served Brentwood directly until February 2008, when the John Marsh Heritage Highway (also known as the California State Route 4 Bypass or Bypass Road, now California State Route 4) was built to connect the western side of Brentwood directly with Antioch. State Route 4 passes by the western edge of Brentwood. The freeway portion of SR 4 ends just south of the Balfour Road exit. SR 4 continues as a two-lane highway to its intersection with Marsh Creek Road and the end of Vasco Road, an unnumbered highway that is the principal route to Livermore, Interstate 580, and the Silicon Valley. To the southeast of Brentwood, County Route J4, known as the Byron Highway, connects to Tracy and the San Joaquin Valley.

Bus service
Local bus service is provided by Tri Delta Transit, a special purpose district providing public transportation for Eastern Contra Costa County. This district also operates express bus service to the Pittsburg/Bay Point and rail station Monday through Friday, several a day.  Due to a route with a number of bus stops, it takes about two hours for the bus to reach Pittsburg/Bay Point BART from the Brentwood Park & Ride lot on Walnut Street.

Rail
A light rail Bay Area Rapid Transit expansion from Bay Point to Hillcrest Avenue, serving East Contra Costa County, known as eBart, was put into regular service in August 2018.

There is no passenger rail service to Brentwood. The nearest Altamont Corridor Express train station is in Livermore. The nearest Amtrak station is in Antioch.

There is a freight-only rail line that passes through Brentwood, which is owned by Union Pacific Railroad.  However, the line has been inactive since the early 1990s. Union Pacific Railroad does have plans to reactivate this line sometime in the future.

Airport
Commercial airports serving this area are:
Oakland International Airport
San Francisco International Airport
San Jose International Airport
Sacramento International Airport
Stockton Metropolitan Airport

Other nearby airports serving private aircraft are:
Byron Airport
Livermore Municipal Airport
Concord (Buchanan Field)

Attractions and lifestyle
Brentwood was one of 212 cities designated by KaBOOM! as a Playful City USA for 2010 - one of only 23 such cities in California and only three in Northern California. This is the seventh consecutive year that Brentwood has been listed. Each community selected demonstrated creative commitments to the cause of play and fitness. Brentwood was selected for a variety of reasons, including the fact that it offers the community its Wellness Policy, a community-wide aspirational goal which promotes physical activity and education as the benefits of living a healthy lifestyle. Brentwood has many parks and miles of jogging trails, to support healthy lifestyles.

The visual and performing arts are well represented in Brentwood. The city is home to the Brentwood Art Society, which sponsors events such as the annual Art, Wine, and Jazz Festival, the Artists Open Studio Tour, open mic nights, and other gatherings and shows. The Art Society is also a supporter of the Brentwood Theater Company, which since 2010 has been producing Broadway musicals and musical reviews in venues around the city. In spring 2014, a major art gallery was opened in the Streets of Brentwood shopping center.

The Brentwood Parks and Recreation Department reports that it is responsible for 72 city parks. Only four of these exceed 10 acres in size, while 23 parks cover less than one acre each.

Points of interest
East Contra Costa Historical Society and Museum - east of Brentwood on Sellers Road.
Los Vaqueros Reservoir 
Marsh Creek Regional Trail 
Marsh Creek State Park - currently not open to the public
Round Valley Regional Preserve 
Vasco Caves Regional Preserve 
Sacramento-San Joaquin River Delta
Brentwood Civic Center
Streets of Brentwood shopping center
John Marsh House - historic home, currently not open to the public; managed by the John Marsh Historic Trust.

Agriculture-related attractions
The Art, Wine, and Jazz Festival is held each year in late August. A host of local vintners, wineries, and brewers participate, including: Hannah Nicole Vineyards, Bloomfield Vineyards, Tamayo Family Vineyards, J Doran Vineyards, Cline Cellars, and Black Diamond Brewery.
Numerous local farms operate produce stands or offer "U-Pick" opportunities throughout Brentwood on the "Harvest Time" farm tour route.
A farmers' market is held on First Street in downtown Brentwood on Saturday mornings from April through October.
Hannah Nicole Vineyards includes a tasting room on Balfour Rd.

References

External links

City of Brentwood official website
Brentwood Chamber of Commerce

 
Cities in Contra Costa County, California
Cities in the San Francisco Bay Area
Sacramento–San Joaquin River Delta
Populated places established in 1948
1948 establishments in California
Incorporated cities and towns in California